William Paul Pennington (born 1967) is a United States Navy rear admiral who has served as chief of staff of the United States Space Command since August 24, 2022. He most recently served as deputy commander of the United States Tenth Fleet from November 2021 to August 2022. He previously commanded Carrier Strike Group 5 from November 2020 to October 2021.

A native of Wilton, Iowa, Pennington graduated from the United States Naval Academy in 1989 with a B.S. degree in economics. He later earned a masters degree from Old Dominion University. He also attended the Harvard Kennedy School, Air Command and Staff College, and Joint Forces Staff College.

Dates of promotion

References

External links

1967 births
Living people
People from Wilton, Iowa
United States Naval Aviators
United States Navy admirals
Military personnel from Iowa